The president of the United Nations General Assembly is a position voted by representatives in the United Nations General Assembly (UNGA) on a yearly basis. The president is the chair and presiding officer of the General Assembly.

Election 

The session of the assembly is scheduled for every year starting in September—any special, or emergency special, assemblies over the next year will be headed by the president of the UNGA.

The presidency rotates annually between the five geographic groups: African, Asia-Pacific, Eastern European, Latin American and Caribbean, and Western European and other States.

Because of their powerful stature globally, some of the largest, most powerful countries have never held the presidency, such as the People's Republic of China, France, Japan, Russia, the United Kingdom, and the United States. In particular, it is customary that no permanent member of the United Nations Security Council ever serves as UNGA president.

The only modern countries that had a national elected as president of UNGA twice are Argentina, Chile, Ecuador, Hungary and Nigeria; all the other member states had been represented only once by their nationals holding this office, and Germany had a national elected once as Federal Republic of Germany and once as German Democratic Republic. This does not include special and emergency special sessions of UNGA.

List of presidents

Abbreviations
 Pre-1966
 COS: Commonwealth Seat
 EAS: Eastern European and Asian Seat
 LAS: Latin American Seat
 MES: Middle Eastern Seat
 WES: Western European Seat

 Since 1966
 Africa: African Group
 Asia-Pacific: Asian Group, since 2011 the Asia-Pacific Group
 EEG: Eastern European Group
 GRULAC: Latin American and Caribbean Group
 WEOG: Western European and Others Group

See also
 President of the United Nations Security Council
 President of the United Nations Economic and Social Council

References

External links

 UN: List of UN General Assembly presidents
 UN General Assembly President Election Reform.
 UNelections.org.
 Elections and appointments (2020-2021)